Eurytium tristani is a species of crab in the family Panopeidae.

References

Xanthoidea
Crustaceans described in 1906